Aston is a hamlet in the county of Staffordshire, England. Aston was recorded in the Domesday Book as Estone.

References 

Hamlets in Staffordshire